Wessel Oltheten is a Dutch recording, mixing and mastering engineer. Artists he worked for include Michael Jackson and David Garrett. In 2018 Wessel published his educational book 'Mixing With Impact'.

References

Living people
Mastering engineers
1983 births